The 1902 Auburn Tigers football team represented Auburn University in the 1902 college football season.  The team finished the season with a record of 2–4–1. The Tigers were coached by two men that year: Ralph S. Kent and M. S. Harvey. A little over halfway through the season, Kent stepped down after going 2–2–1. Harvey followed and in his only season as head coach went 0–2. The Tigers only played one true home game in Auburn, the November 15 game against Clemson.  The Tigers played their other home games in either Birmingham or Atlanta.

Schedule

References

Auburn
Auburn Tigers football seasons
Auburn Tigers football